Odaray Mountain is a  summit located west of Lake O'Hara in the Bow Range of Yoho National Park, in the Canadian Rockies of British Columbia, Canada. Its nearest higher peak is Mount Huber,  to the east. The standard climbing route follows the southeast glacier and ridge starting from Elizabeth Parker hut. Pronunciation sounds like the two words "ode array" (/ōd/ /əˈrā/).

History

The first ascent of the mountain was made in 1887 by James J. McArthur, and he named it Odaray which is the expression for "many waterfalls" in the Stoney language. Other reports have it being named in 1894 by Samuel Evans Stokes Allen for the Stoney Indian word for "cone". However, it is possible that McArthur only ascended the lesser secondary summit cone (2965 m) now known as Little Odaray which is southeast of the true summit.  The mountain's current name became official in 1952 when the Geographical Names Board of Canada rescinded the name Mount Odaray.

Geology

Odaray Mountain is composed of sedimentary rock laid down during the Precambrian to Jurassic periods. Formed in shallow seas, this sedimentary rock was pushed east and over the top of younger rock during the Laramide orogeny.

Climate

Based on the Köppen climate classification, Odaray Mountain is located in a subarctic climate zone with cold, snowy winters, and mild summers. Winter temperatures can drop below −20 °C with wind chill factors below −30 °C. Precipitation runoff from Odaray Mountain drains into tributaries of the Kicking Horse River which is a tributary of the Columbia River.

References

See also
Geography of British Columbia
Burgess Shale

External links

 Odaray Mountain: Weather forecast
 Parks Canada web site: Yoho National Park
 Climbing Little Odaray: explor8ion.com

Three-thousanders of British Columbia
Canadian Rockies
Mountains of Yoho National Park
Kootenay Land District